Jinchang is a prefecture-level city in the centre of Gansu province, People's Republic of China, bordering Inner Mongolia to the north. As of the 2020 Chinese census, its population was 438,026 inhabitants, of which 260,385 lived in the built-up (or metro) areamade of the Jinchuan District.

Geography 
Jinchang City is located in central Gansu province, west of the Yellow River, north of the Qilian Mountains, and south of the Alashan Plateau. The southwest of the city borders Qinghai Province and the northwest borders Inner Mongolia.

Transportation
Jinchang is served by the Lanzhou-Xinjiang Railway and the Jinchang Jinchuan Airport, opened in August 2011.

History
Jinchang has important archaeological sites from the Stone Age, a Western Han site, and sections of the Great Wall from the Han and Qing dynasties.

Administration
Jinchang has 1 district and 1 county with a total population of 464,050, half of which is urban.

Climate 

Jinchang has a continental, semi-arid climate (Köppen BSk), with plenty of sunshine and a prevailing northwesterly wind throughout much of the year. Both diurnal and seasonal temperature variations are rather large, and springtime winds are often strong.

Economy
The 2002 GDP was 4.5 billion RMB. The average urban income was 8,233 RMB while rural was 3,051 RMB. Agriculture and natural resource based industries are the key to Jinchang's economy. It is called China's 'Nickel Capital' and has an abundance of other mineral resources including quartz, iron, manganese, copper, cobalt, zinc, gold, tungsten, limestone, etc. Here placed Jinchuan Group.
The installation of a solar farm in the western part of Jinchang with a rated capacity of 1 GW and of a solar production facility with 300 MW capacity has been announced in May 2012.

Vegetable oil is its primary agricultural product.

Tourism
Cultural sites such as the Han and Qing dynasty Great Walls are popular tourist sites. The relatively undeveloped natural environment is also a draw for tourists.

External links

  Official site

References

 
Prefecture-level divisions of Gansu